Elections to Dacorum Borough Council in Hertfordshire, England were held on 5 May 2011. The whole council was up for election. The last election for the Borough Council was held in May 2007.

Election result

Ward results

Adeyfield East (2)

Adeyfield West (2)

Aldbury and Wigginton

Apsley and Corner Hall (3)

Ashridge

Bennetts End (2)

Berkhamsted Castle (2)

Berkhamsted East (2)

Berkhamsted West (2)

Bovingdon, Flaunden & Chipperfield (3)

Boxmoor (3)

Chaulden and Warners End (3)

Gadebridge (2)

Grovehill (3)

Hemel Hempstead Town (2)

Highfield (2)

Kings Langley (2)

Leverstock Green (3)

Nash Mills

Northchurch

Tring Central (2)

Tring East

Tring West and Rural (2)

Watling (2)

Woodhall Farm (2)

References

2011
2011 English local elections
2010s in Hertfordshire